The GLAAD Media Award for Outstanding Breakthrough Music Artist is an annual award honoring musicians who use songs, music videos and live performances to accelerate LGBTQ acceptance. The artists may be LGBTQ or allies. Artists are eligible who have released a full-length or EP-length album, or single sold through a major retail or online music store. In addition to the music itself, media interviews, public statements and other information may be considered when selecting nominees and award recipients. It is one of several categories of the GLAAD Media Awards presented by GLAAD, a US non-governmental media monitoring organization founded in 1985 (formerly called the Gay & Lesbian Alliance Against Defamation) at ceremonies in New York, Los Angeles and San Francisco between March and June.

The category was first presented at the 32nd GLAAD Media Awards in 2021 and is a companion to the GLAAD Media Award for Outstanding Music Artist. The inaugural recipient of the award was rapper Chika for her EP Industry Games. The current holder of the award is country singer Lily Rose, who won for her debut album Stronger Than I Am. In the first two years of the category, artists were nominated for a specific album/EP however, as of the 34th GLAAD Media Awards, artists are instead nominated for their work as a whole.

Eligibility
According to GLAAD, Outstanding Breakthrough Music Artist is given to a music artist who has achieved a breakthrough in the music industry during the current eligibility period and whose songs, music videos, or live performances have made a significant impact on LGBTQ visibility and acceptance. The artist must have released a full-length or EP-length album during the current eligibility period. The album must be sold through a major music retail store and/or a major online music store. Media interviews, public statements, and other information may be considered when selecting nominees and award recipients. Artists nominated for Outstanding Breakthrough Music Artist cannot be nominated for Outstanding Music Artist in the same year.

Winners and nominees

2020s

References

GLAAD Media Awards
LGBT-related music